Richie Bayes (March 21, 1948 – October 16, 2006) was a Canadian professional ice hockey centre who was selected by the Chicago Black Hawks in the first round (fourth overall) of the 1964 NHL Amateur Draft, however he never played a game in the NHL. After his retirement from professional hockey, he worked at the Bible Hill Junior High School as a vice principal and teacher in Bible Hill, Nova Scotia. He also coached for the Truro and Area Minor Hockey Association.

Career statistics

See also

List of Chicago Blackhawks players

References

External links
 

1948 births
2006 deaths
Canadian ice hockey centres
Chicago Blackhawks draft picks
Ice hockey people from Toronto
National Hockey League first-round draft picks